Bilene, also known as Praia do Bilene, is a town in southern Mozambique, lying 140 kilometres northeast of Maputo in the province of Gaza.  It is known as a beach resort, lying on the Mozambique Channel.  Noted for its calm and clear lagoon, the Uembje Lagoon, giving way to the pounding Indian Ocean beyond tall dunes, it is reported to be the closest beach destination to the city of Johannesburg in neighboring South Africa.

Transportation
The town has an airport called Bilene Airport, currently disused.

Tourism
Popular tourist activities in Bilene include sailing, canoeing, windsurfing, snorkelling, paragliding and kite surfing.

See also
Clube do Bilene

References

Bilene Macia District
Populated places in Gaza Province
Mozambique Channel